Lance Sergeant John Harold Rhodes VC DCM & Bar (17 May 1891 – 27 November 1917) was a British Army soldier and an English recipient of the Victoria Cross (VC), the highest and most prestigious award for gallantry in the face of the enemy that can be awarded to British and Commonwealth forces.

Early life
Rhodes was born on 17 May 1891 in England in Packmoor, Stoke-on-Trent, Staffordshire, the son of an ex-soldier and miner, Ernie Rhodes. He was educated in Newchapel and later became a miner at the Chatterley Whitfield Colliery. Around 1910, however, he joined the Grenadier Guards of the British Army and served for three years, after which he returned to the colliery.

First World War
On the outbreak of the First World War, John was recalled to the forces as a reservist. Now 26 years old, and a Lance-Sergeant in the 3rd Battalion, Grenadier Guards, British Army during the First World War John won the Distinguished Conduct Medal on 17 May 1915 and three months later was awarded a bar to this medal. While back in England recovering from his wounds, John married Lizzie but was not destined to live to see their son, John Rhodes (who, as an artilleryman, was himself awarded the Oak Leaves for gallantry in Northwestern Europe in 1944),

Back on the front-line, the following deed took place at the Battle of Poelcapelle for which John was awarded the VC and also the Croix De Guerre:

He was killed in action at Fontaine-Notre-Dame, France on 27 November 1917 and buried at Rocquigny-Equancourt Road British Cemetery, Manancourt.

Medal
His Victoria Cross is displayed at The Guards Regimental Headquarters (Grenadier Guards RHQ) in Wellington Barracks, London, England.

A memorial plaque was unveiled at Chatterley Whitfield Mining Museum on 20 April 1984. There is also a road named in honour of John at nearby Tunstall. There is a memorial in Packmoor village on the Millennium Green outside Packmoor School which was unveiled in 2000.

References

Monuments to Courage (David Harvey, 1999)
The Register of the Victoria Cross (This England, 1997)
VCs of the First World War: Passchendaele 1917 (Stephen Snelling, 1998)

External links

1891 births
1917 deaths
Burials in France
People from Tunstall, Staffordshire
British World War I recipients of the Victoria Cross
Grenadier Guards soldiers
British Army personnel of World War I
British military personnel killed in World War I
Recipients of the Distinguished Conduct Medal
British Army recipients of the Victoria Cross
Burials at Rocquigny-Equancourt Road British Cemetery
Military personnel from Staffordshire